"Change of Heart" is a song recorded by American rock band Tom Petty and the Heartbreakers. It was released in February 1983 as the second single from their fifth album Long After Dark. It peaked at number 21 on the U.S. Billboard Hot 100 chart.
The B side, "Heartbreakers Beach Party," was exclusive to this single and remains unreleased on CD.

Background
Petty was inspired to write "Change of Heart" based on The Move's 1972 single "Do Ya". Petty was very inspired by the way Jeff Lynne had used chords on the track, and wanted to use the same "crunchy" guitar riff that was used on "Do Ya". After that, the lyrics and title came and the song was completed.

Reception
Cash Box said that Petty's "chiming guitar" and "ultra-nasal" vocal, as well as the "a rock steady beat and elaborate percussion" allow the singer to express his feelings.

Chart performance

Weekly charts

Year-end charts

Limited edition
The first 100,000 copies in the US were pressed on red vinyl and came in a stickered transparent sleeve.

References

External links
 

1983 singles
1982 songs
American power pop songs
Tom Petty songs
Songs written by Tom Petty
Song recordings produced by Jimmy Iovine